3708 Socus is a large Jupiter trojan from the Trojan camp, approximately  in diameter. It was discovered on 21 March 1974, by staff members of the Cerro El Roble Observatory owned and operated by the Department of Astronomy of the University of Chile. The assumed C-type asteroid has a rotation period of 6.55 hours. It was named after Socus, a hero from Greek mythology, who was killed in battle by Odysseus.

Orbit and classification 

Socus is a dark Jovian asteroid orbiting in the trailing Trojan camp at Jupiter's  Lagrangian point, 60° behind its orbit in a 1:1 resonance (see Trojans in astronomy). It is also a non-family asteroid of the Jovian background population.

It orbits the Sun at a distance of 4.4–6.0 AU once every 11 years and 11 months (4,353 days; semi-major axis of 5.22 AU). Its orbit has an eccentricity of 0.16 and an inclination of 13° with respect to the ecliptic. The body's observation arc begins with a precovery taken at Lowell Observatory in November 1930, more than 43 years prior to its official discovery observation at Cerro El Roble.

Numbering and naming 

This minor planet was numbered by the Minor Planet Center on 7 October 1987. On 14 May 2021, the object was named after Socus from Greek mythology by the Working Group Small Body Nomenclature (WGSBN). While defending his brother, Socus was killed by Odysseus, who taunted him as he died.

Until the asteroid received its name in May 2021, it had been the lowest-numbered unnamed minor planet for many years (there are more than half a million numbered minor planets with more than 20,000 of them being named). This contrasts with the neighboring asteroids 3707 Schröter and 3709 Polypoites, that were named in September 1993 and April 1988, respectively. The asteroid 4035 Thestor, the next-lowest numbered unnamed minor planet, was also named by the WGSBN in May 2021.

Physical characteristics 

Socus is an assumed, carbonaceous C-type asteroid.

Rotation period 

In February 1993, a rotational lightcurve of Socus was obtained from photometric observations by Italian astronomers Stefano Mottola and Mario Di Martino, using the ESO 1-metre telescope at ESO's La Silla site, Chile. Lightcurve analysis gave a rotation period of 6.553 hours with a brightness variation of 0.23 magnitude.

Diameter and albedo 

According to the surveys carried out by the Japanese Akari satellite, the NEOWISE mission of NASA's Wide-field Infrared Survey Explorer, and the Infrared Astronomical Satellite IRAS, Socus measures between 75.66 and 79.59 kilometers in diameter and its surface has an albedo between 0.053 and 0.59.

The Collaborative Asteroid Lightcurve Link adopts the results obtained by IRAS, that is, an albedo of 0.0531 and a diameter of 79.59 kilometers based on an absolute magnitude of 9.3.

Notes

References

External links 
 Asteroid Lightcurve Database (LCDB), query form (info )
 Discovery Circumstances: Numbered Minor Planets (1)-(5000) – Minor Planet Center
 
 

003708
003708
Named minor planets
19740321